For Life is the second studio album by Soul for Real, released on September 24, 1996. The album was released quickly after their debut studio album Candy Rain. During that time, Uptown Records founder Andre Harrell left the label to become the president at Motown Records.  MCA Music Entertainment Group  CEO Doug Morris promoted Heavy D. as the new president of Uptown several months before the release of For Life. As a result, Uptown was moved from its parent company MCA Records to the newly launched Doug Morris label Universal Records.

The first single released was the Chucky Thompson produced first single "Never Felt This Way", followed by the Sean "Puffy" Combs & Stevie J. produced second single "Love You So". Despite getting good reviews, the album was met with the sophomore jinx. This album would be the first of a long line of R&B albums that were underpromoted while being released under Universal Records. For Life would be their last album recorded for a major label, as they would go independent for their next album.

Track listing
Stay (Tony Dofat, Louise Francis, Chris Dalyrimple, Brian Dalyrimple, Andre Dalyrimple, Jason Dalyrimple)
Never Felt This Way (Dwight Meyers, Nicole Johnson)
You Just Don't Know (Dwight Meyers, Tony Dofat, Erik Milteer, Felicia Adams)
Love You So (Sean Combs, Steven Jordan, Marvin Scandrick, Michael Keith, Quinnes Parker, Daron Jones)
Let's Stay Together (Al Green, Willie Mitchell, Al Jackson, Jr.)
Good to You (Nicole Johnson)
Being With You (Tim Kelley, Bob Robinson)
Leavin' (Dwight Meyers, Rhano Burrell, Rheji Burrell, Curt Gaddy, Chris Dalyrimple, Brian Dalyrimple, Andre Dalyrimple, Jason Dalyrimple)
Where Do We Go (Sean Combs, Steve Jordan, Marvin Scandrick, Michael Keith, Quinnes Parker, Daron Jones)
I'm Coming Home (Dwight Meyers, Faith Evans)
Your Love Is Calling (Rhano Burrell, Rheji Burrell, Chris Dalyrimple, Brian Dalyrimple, Andre Dalyrimple, Jason Dalyrimple)
I Don't Wanna Say Goodbye (Faith Evans, Chris Dalyrimple, Brian Dalyrimple, Andre Dalyrimple, Jason Dalyrimple, Rhano Burrell, Rheji Burrell)
Can't You Tell (Acapella) (Chris Dalyrimple, Brian Dalyrimple, Andre Dalyrimple, Jason Dalyrimple)

Samples
 "Stay" contains a sample of "Mind Power", as performed by James Brown
 "You Just Don't Know" contains a sample of "Take Some Leave Some", as performed by James Brown
 "Love You So" contains a sample of "Blues & Pants", as performed by James Brown

Personnel
 Keyboards and drum programming: Tony Dofat, Chucky Thompson, Stevie J., Chris Kringle, Tim Kelley, Bob Robinson, Rhano Burrell, Rheji Burrell, Dave Cintron
 Guitar: Rob Bacon, Jon Shriver
 Background vocals: Soul for Real, Erik Milteer, Monifah
 Recording engineer: Carl Nappa, Jon Shriver, Lane Craven, Tony Dofat, Andy Grassi, Ian Dalsemer, Bill Esses, Rhano Burrell, Rheji Burrell
 Mixing: Jon Shriver, Chucky Thompson, Tony Dofat, Paul Logus, Rhano Burrell, Rheji Burrell, Jamey Staub, Prince Charles Alexander, Carl Nappa
 Mastering: Chris Gehringer
 Photography: Daniela Federici
 Art direction: Nicole L. Dollison
 Design: Eric Altenburger, Elizabeth Barrett

References

1996 albums
Soul for Real albums
MCA Records albums
Albums produced by Tim & Bob